1,3-Bis(dicyanomethylene)squarate is a divalent anion with chemical formula  or ((N≡C−)C=)(CO).  It is one of the pseudo-oxocarbon anions, as it can be described as a derivative of the squarate oxocarbon anion  through the replacement of two opposite oxygen atoms by dicyanomethylene groups =C(−C≡N).

The anion can be obtained by reacting squaric acid with aniline to form the diester 1,3-dianiline squarate (a yellow solid), before treating the diester with malononitrile (N≡C−)CH and sodium ethoxide to give the disodium tetrahydrate salt 2Na··4HO, an orange water-soluble solid.  The hydrated salt loses the water below 100 °C, but the resulting anhydrous salt is stable up to 400 °C. Reaction of the sodium salt with salts of other cations in ethanol affords the following salts:
 dipotassium sodium chloride 2K·Na·Cl··CHCN, orange
 rubidium sodium chloride 7Rb·Na·2Cl·3·, orange, loses 1 ethanol at 96 °C, stable to 361 °C
 magnesium disodium nitrate, Mg·2Na··6HO·, orange, loses 1 ethanol and 6 HO at 78 °C, stable to 482 °C
 calcium, Ca··6HO, purple, dehydrates at 63–102 °C, stable to 468 °C
 barium, Ba··4HO, orange, dehydrates at 71–96 °C, stable to 457 °C
 tetra-n-butylammonium sodium, 2()N·2Na·2Cl·2·, orange, loses 1 ethanol and 2 tetrabutylammonium at 111 °C, stable to 238 °C

Nuclear magnetic resonance shows that the aromatic character of the squarate core is retained.

See also
Croconate violet
Croconate blue
1,2-Bis(dicyanomethylene)squarate

References

Oxyanions
Cyclobutenes